The Moroccan jird (Meriones grandis) is a species of rodent from the family Muridae. The species was first discovered by Ángel Cabrera in 1907. It is endemic to Morocco, northern Algeria, and Tunisia. It had been included as part of Shaw's jird (Meriones shawi), but was considered in 2000 to be a separate species.

See also 
Shaw's jird

References 

Mammals described in 1907
Meriones (rodent)